David E. Foley (born October 28, 1947) is a former professional American football offensive lineman who played in the National Football League (NFL) for the New York Jets and Buffalo Bills.

Foley was a three-year starter at offensive tackle for the Ohio State Buckeyes under head coach Woody Hayes.  Foley stated that he did not intend to come to Ohio State but was won over by charisma of coach Hayes and by seeing The Ohio State University Marching Band performing in Ohio Stadium.  Foley played right tackle in 1966 and 1967, and moved to left tackle in 1968.  Prior to his senior year, he was named a team co-captain, along with linebacker Dirk Worden.  That year the Buckeyes finished the season undefeated and were voted consensus national champions after defeating the University of Southern California in the 1969 Rose Bowl.  

Foley was a consensus All-America selection in 1968.  He was also a three-year Academic All-American. He was elected to the Ohio State Varsity O Hall of Fame in 1984.

Foley was selected in the first round of the 1969 NFL Draft by the New York Jets.  After two years with the Jets he was traded to the Buffalo Bills, where he played for the remainder of his professional career. A Pro Bowl selection in 1973, he was the starting right tackle with the Bills' Electric Company.

While still an active player in 1972, he started Dave Foley & Associates which originally specialized in life insurance and health group benefits. Retirement plan third-party administration was added to its operations in 1986. The company expanded further in 1999 and was renamed Foley Benefits Group, LLC. His brother, Tim Foley, works at the business and is also a 1977 National Champion for the Notre Dame Fighting Irish as well as a former professional offensive tackle. Foley Benefits Group, LLC is based in Springfield, Ohio.

References

1947 births
Living people
American football offensive tackles
Buffalo Bills players
New York Jets players
Ohio State Buckeyes football players
All-American college football players
American Conference Pro Bowl players
Players of American football from Cincinnati